Ravine du Chaudron is a river in Réunion. It flows into the Indian Ocean near Saint-Denis.

References

Rivers of Réunion
Saint-Denis, Réunion
Rivers of France